Michele Ivaldi (born 11 March 1970) is an Italian yacht racer who competed in the 1996 Summer Olympics.
 
He sailed with Luna Rossa Challenge in the 2007 America's Cup. He then joined Oracle Racing in 2008, before joining Artemis Racing for the 2010 Louis Vuitton Trophy Dubai.

References

External links
 
 
 

1970 births
Living people
Italian male sailors (sport)
Olympic sailors of Italy
Sailors at the 1996 Summer Olympics – 470
470 class world champions
ClubSwan 50 class world champions
RC44 class world champions
World champions in sailing for Italy
Luna Rossa Challenge sailors
2007 America's Cup sailors
Artemis Racing sailors
Oracle Racing sailors
Competitors at the 1993 Mediterranean Games
Mediterranean Games gold medalists for Italy